Chelmen Sang-e Olya (also Romanized as Chelmen Sang-e ‘Olyā; also known as Chelmen Sang-e Bālā, Chelmeh Sang-e ‘Olyā, Chelmeh Sang-e Pā’īn, and Chelmeh Sang Pā’īn) is a village in Abravan Rural District, Razaviyeh District, Mashhad County, Razavi Khorasan Province, Iran. At the 2006 census, its population was 55, in 13 families.

References 

Populated places in Mashhad County